Filatima confusatella is a moth of the family Gelechiidae. It is found in North America, where it has been recorded from New Jersey.

References

Moths described in 1948
Filatima